Queenscliffe Museum may refer to:
Queenscliffe Historical Museum
Queenscliffe Maritime Museum